2-Epimerase can refer one of to several enzymes:

 N-acylglucosamine 2-epimerase
 N-acylglucosamine-6-phosphate 2-epimerase
 UDP-N-acetylglucosamine 2-epimerase, the target of the experimental antibiotic epimerox
 UDP-N-acetylglucosamine 2-epimerase (hydrolysing)
 UDP-N,N'-diacetylbacillosamine 2-epimerase (hydrolysing)
 CDP-paratose 2-epimerase

Isomerases